Oleg Alekseyevich Murachyov (born 22 February 1995) is a Russian football player who plays for Kyzylzhar in Kazakhstan.

Club career
He made his debut in the Russian Professional Football League for PFC Spartak Nalchik on 28 July 2015 in a game against FC Druzhba Maykop. He made his Russian Football National League debut for Spartak Nalchik on 11 July 2016 in a game against FC Kuban Krasnodar.

References

External links
 Profile by Russian Professional Football League
 
 

1995 births
Living people
People from Naro-Fominsky District
Sportspeople from Moscow Oblast
Russian footballers
Russia youth international footballers
Association football defenders
Russian expatriate footballers
Expatriate footballers in Belarus
Expatriate footballers in Kazakhstan
FC Torpedo Moscow players
FC Lokomotiv Moscow players
FC Tyumen players
PFC Spartak Nalchik players
FC Volgar Astrakhan players
FC Urozhay Krasnodar players
FC Neman Grodno players
FC Kyzylzhar players
Belarusian Premier League players
Kazakhstan Premier League players